Focus on Labour Exploitation (FLEX) is a London-based charity working to end human trafficking for labour exploitation. FLEX conducts research, advocacy and awareness-raising in order to prevent labour abuses, protect the rights of trafficked persons and promote best practice responses to human trafficking for labour exploitation. FLEX was founded in 2013 by Caroline Robinson and Claire Falconer. In 2015 FLEX developed the Labour Exploitation Accountability Hub, a free online resource which provides legal information on corporate and government accountability for human trafficking and labour exploitation worldwide.

External links
 Focus on Labour Exploitation

Human rights organisations based in the United Kingdom
Organizations that combat human trafficking
Charities based in London